Altamount Road, also known as India's Billionaires’ Row, is an affluent neighbourhood in Mumbai, India.

The area is notable for some of the most expensive residences in the world consisting of ultra-luxurious residential skyscrapers, constructed or in development. It is the most expensive street in India and 10th most expensive in the world.

The most prominent buildings on the street are The Imperial, Lodha Altamount, Antilia, and Raheja One Altamount. The ultra-luxury building boom in the area predates the term "Billionaire's Row."

The street
On Altamount Road are the consulates of Indonesia (Plot no. 19) and of South Africa (Plot no. 20); on the connecting Carmichael Road are the Belgian, Chinese, and Japanese consulates. The road has been in the news in recent times because of the completed construction of the costliest home in the world, Antilia, a 27-storey mansion by the Indian industrialist, Mukesh Ambani. In 2008, it was rated as the 10th most affluent street in the world.
Altamount Road is a very wealthy area, and also home to several industrialists. The Mafatlal complex is also located here. Also, it is home to Lodha Altamount which created history in November 2015 by selling the most expensive apartment in the country.

The road was officially renamed "S. K. Barodawalla Marg" in the 1990s, but residents, the city's taxi-drivers, and others continue to refer to it by its former name. It has a large number of trees and heritage buildings, such as the official residence of the Chairman of the Bombay Port Trust, the residence of the Municipal Commissioner of Mumbai, the consulate residence of Japan, Belgium and formerly the United States, and the official residence of the General Manager of Western Railways. The residential bungalow of the Bombay Port Trust was originally made by George Wittet, who also designed the Gateway of India and The Grand Hotel at Ballard Estate.

References

Streets in Mumbai
Neighbourhoods in Mumbai